Beguelkar Airport  is a public use airport located near Beguelkar, Logone Oriental, Chad.

See also
List of airports in Chad

References

External links 
 Airport record for Beguelkar Airport at Landings.com

Airports in Chad
Logone Oriental Region